OpenUniverse is a 3D Solar System simulator created by Raúl Alonso Álvarez. It uses OpenGL 1.1 (Implemented through Mesa 3D) to simulate the Solar system in complete 3D, including its planets and their major and minor moons, along with a few asteroids with real 3D models created from real data. OpenUniverse is free software distributed under the GNU General Public License. OU is compatible with Windows 95/98/NT/2000, Linux/Unix, and MacOS (Ported by Sandy Martel, download link lost), and OpenGL 1.1 drivers are required for the program to run correctly. A high-resolution texture pack is available on the SourceForge, and it is linked on the official website under the Download section.

OU likely served as the inspiration for the much more widely-used interactive planetarium program Celestia, which in itself served as the inspiration for the infamous SpaceEngine procedural universe simulator.

See also 
Celestia
Orbiter
Stellarium
KStars

External links
 Files hosted on SourceForge
 Ubuntu packages details
 Debian packages details
 Fedora packages details
 Windows free download

Simulation software
Astronomy software